Goulien is a commune in the Finistère department of Brittany in north-western France.

Population
Inhabitants of Goulien are called in French Goulienois.

See also
Communes of the Finistère department

References

External links

Mayors of Finistère Association 

Communes of Finistère
Populated coastal places in France